Psectrogaster is a genus of toothless characins from South America, with these currently described species:
 Psectrogaster amazonica C. H. Eigenmann & R. S. Eigenmann, 1889
 Psectrogaster ciliata (J. P. Müller & Troschel, 1844)
 Psectrogaster curviventris C. H. Eigenmann & C. H. Kennedy, 1903
 Psectrogaster essequibensis (Günther, 1864)
 Psectrogaster falcata (C. H. Eigenmann & R. S. Eigenmann, 1889)
 Psectrogaster rhomboides C. H. Eigenmann & R. S. Eigenmann, 1889
 Psectrogaster rutiloides (Kner, 1858)
 Psectrogaster saguiru (Fowler, 1941)

References
 

Curimatidae
Taxa named by Rosa Smith Eigenmann
Taxa named by Carl H. Eigenmann
Fish of South America